Superman: The New Superman Adventures, commonly referred to as Superman 64, is an action-adventure video game developed and published by Titus Interactive for the Nintendo 64 and based on the television series Superman: The Animated Series. Released in North America on May 31, 1999, and in Europe on July 23, 1999, it is the first 3D Superman game.

In the game, Lex Luthor has trapped Jimmy Olsen, Lois Lane, and Professor Hamilton in a virtual reality version of Metropolis that he created with the help of Brainiac, leaving it up to Superman to save them and break apart the virtual world. The game shifts between outdoor levels where the player flies through rings while saving civilians, and indoor levels where the player looks for access cards, activates computers, and fights villains such as Brainiac, Mala, Metallo, Darkseid, and Parasite.

The development of Superman began in 1997 and was largely hampered by constraints between Titus and the game's licensors, Warner Bros. and DC Comics, leaving little room for polishing the gameplay. BlueSky Software attempted to redo the game for the PlayStation, but this version was ultimately canceled, as Titus's license with Warner Bros had expired by the time it was completed. With three E3 presentations and positive press coverage before its release, Superman 64 was released to strong sales and positive consumer reception; however, critical reviews were extremely negative, panning its unresponsive controls, technical flaws, repetitive gameplay, overuse of distance fog, and poor graphics, as well as calling it one of the worst video games ever made.

Gameplay 

Superman is a three-dimensional action-adventure platform game, where the player acts as the titular hero saving the citizens of Metropolis, such as Lois Lane, Jimmy Olsen and Professor Emil Hamilton, from a virtual reality of it created by Lex Luthor. Virtual Metropolis is filled with what the developers call "Kryptonite fog" in an apparent effort by Lex Luthor to diminish Superman's abilities (which is actually distance fog and is used as a technique to mask the game's poor draw distance). 

In the main single-player mode, the player assumes the role of Superman, who is challenged by Luthor to complete various tasks and puzzles. Superman can walk, fly, punch enemies, and use super-strength to lift and carry large objects.  Superman's other superpowers, including Heat Vision, Freeze Breath, X-Ray Vision, Super Speed, and Reprogrammation (where Superman reprograms an enemy to help fight off other enemies), are only accessible through the collection of power-ups in certain levels and have limited reserves.  If Superman is attacked by enemies, hazards, or is in close proximity to Kryptonite, his health will decrease. The player will enter game over (indicated with "LEX WINS") and will be required to restart the current mission if Superman loses all his health. The player will also enter game over if a civilian character is attacked or time limits imposed on various missions expire before they are completed.

Superman consists of fourteen levels, alternating between outdoor and indoor levels. The indoor levels involve combat, exploring environments to find access codes to locked areas, activating computers, solving puzzles to finish objectives, and fights with villains such as Mala, Metallo, Darkseid, and Brainiac, who is responsible for programming the computers that trap them in Luthor's virtual reality. Outdoor stages consist of traversing to the next indoor mission while flying through rings and saving civilians from enemies and hazards. Several missions must be completed under time limits. Superman: The New Superman  has three difficulty modes: Easy, Normal, and Superman. Although in the easy mode the player does not have to fly through rings to get to goals in the ride stages, the last two maze sections are only playable on Normal and Superman, and the concluding stage only on Superman mode. The time available to complete missions also decreases the higher the difficulty.

The game includes two multiplayer modes (a racing mode and a battle mode) that can be played with up to four people. In the battle mode, players must defeat their opponents by throwing various weapons and items at them. In the racing mode, players control a spaceship and rings shoot from the backside of one opponent.

Development
Eric Caen, one of the founders of French developer Titus Interactive, garnered the rights from WB Licensing to produce a Superman game during the development of The Animated Series. Hearing about the upcoming show in the Los Angeles offices of Titus, Caen went after the license as no other company would. He recalled in a 2015 interview that Warner Bros. "asked me three times if I was sure of what I was doing". In early 1997 Titus signed a licensing deal with Warner Bros. to make games based on Superman: The Animated Series for the Nintendo 64, PlayStation, and Game Boy. The staff for the development of each port consisted of two programmers and six to nine artists. The Game Boy game was completed and released by the end of the year. 

The Nintendo 64 game's development lasted two years. Caen's initial plan was for a style of gameplay only Tomb Raider (1996) had tried before, a 3D open world action-adventure video game involving real-time strategy where players really behave as a superhero. As he explained, "it would stretch the Nintendo 64 to its limits, feature Superman's ability to fly and fight, and include his every superpower." However, it would be too much for the Nintendo 64's limitations. As a result, less than ten percent of the original design was implemented in the final product. 

Only a few days after the deal was made, the Warner Bros. licensing team changed. Based on Caen's testimony, the new group instantly hated Titus and the project and tried to stop its development. The first demand was to make Superman "a Sim City-like game, where Superman would be like the mayor of Metropolis", instead of an action game. Warner Bros. only got more coercive after Titus rejected the idea, going against any decision of the French developer. Often, their reasoning for rejection was that Superman would never do the things Titus proposed. Elements that survived, such as Superman swimming underwater, were kept in after Titus staff members showed documentation of the original Superman comics. 

Some changes were mandated for reasons of putting the fictional DC Comics hero in a positive light. In addition to the limiting of Superman's powers and removal of breakable architecture, the game was set in a virtual world in order for the titular hero to not harm "real" people. Although the ring stages were originally supposed to be tutorial stages, they became a part of regular gameplay due to the other changes. These conflicts resulted in a delayed production process where "it took [Titus] months to get every single character approved" and an inability to fix bugs and issues associated with the collision detection and controls that the final product would be criticized for. Near the end of its development, technical support was provided for Titus by Nintendo of America.

Pre-release publicity
Superman was shown at three E3 events in 1997, 1998, and 1999. The game was unofficially named Superman 64 by some publications since the 1997 E3 event, as indicated by its coverage from Game Informer. The 1997 presentation of the game did not reveal anything about taking place in a virtual world, but stated its premise would be Superman trying to save Lois and Metropolis from Lex Luthor's very dangerous creation the Lexoskel-5000. Additionally, it showcased models of empty rooms, a concept model of Lex Luthor, and emphasized Superman's X-ray vision power that made strong use of the console's graphical capabilities. An IGN journalist covering the event saw little promise in the game: "For a true fan, the game probably looked great, because it was at least something to show, but to the casual observer or the jaded critic, the game just looked poor." Animation World Network, however, was more optimistic, claiming that the game appeared to have "stunning 3D environments, various fight levels and rescue operations." At the time of the 1997 E3 showing, the release date was set for late 1997, but was later delayed.

Titus announced Superman to be around 85–95% complete in March 1998. The game was delayed again after the 1998 E3 showing in response to gameplay criticisms, and released 3D character models and map sheets of the levels on 24 August 1998. GamePro, labeling the game an "E3 showstopper," noted its "good-looking graphics."

In June 1998, GameFan published the first screenshots of completed parts of Superman, which included views of the interiors, Metropolis, and the 3D model of Superman. The magazine also offered enthusiastic coverage about it, with journalist ECM reporting other staff "drooling over these first-look shots at the game;" he suggested the game "could be one of the hotter N64 titles of the year even with heavyweights like Zelda and Banjo coming down the line" and that its "astounding" visuals, apart from the fog in the Metropolis shots, "looks set to raise the bar on the N64 again" with its "clean textures and smooth animation." He announced gameplay details such as "an assortment of missions numbering in the twenties" and powers such as X-ray and Heat Vision, as well as the inclusion of villains like Brainiac and Bizarro. Gamers' Republic, in July 1998, reported that Superman consisted of 15 stages where the playable character is "beating up bad guys and solving puzzles while trying to find the kryptonite diffusers in each level," also revealing a four-player battle mode the source positively compared to Star Fox; it felt its levels looked "well designed" and applauded its incorporation of Superman's powers.

Nintendo Magazines preview coverage in an August 1998 issue showed Titus still had not implemented non-tutorial ring stages and a virtual world setting in its plot; the premise was presented as Luthor trapping all of the Metropolis citizens in a "deadly Kryptonite fog." The magazine also saw promise in the final product, claiming that it was "packed with great ideas, and the four-player mode looks like a right good left." In the December 1998 issue, the magazine, which changed its name to Nintendo Official Magazine, ran another preview piece showcasing more of Superman's abilities in the game, such as breaking through bricks, lifting cars and humans, punching, and using heat vision and ice breath; it announced a January 1999 release date in North America and a spring date in Europe.

A press release in October 1998 showed that at point, Superman 64s release date was set on November 16, 1998, with "a huge promotional campaign to include; special in-store promotions and displays, advertising, television, on-line and print media. Promotional items will include: standees, t-shirts, game footage, videotapes and oversized boxes."

Superman was one of only five Nintendo 64 games presented at the 1999 Tokyo Game Show.

Cancelled PlayStation version
After the critical failure of the N64 version, Titus gave BlueSky Software the reins to completely redesign Superman for the PlayStation. The game received approval from Sony, but the license from Warner Bros. had expired and Titus was unable to secure a new one, resulting in the game's cancellation in 2000. According to Caen, after Warner Bros. "forced us to kill the PlayStation version," the company was planning to pay Titus a litigation settlement as a payback for its abusive behavior against the developer. A build of the game dated to June 22, 2000 was eventually uploaded to MediaFire on November 28, 2020, by Richard Evan Mandel, who announced and linked to the build's release via a journal post on his DeviantArt page.

Reception

NPD Group data reported Superman being a top-ten seller in North America during the weeks of June 1999. In July of that same year, Titus announced that Superman had been the third best selling game for the N64. Over 500,000 units were sold. Eric Caen projected in 1998 sales of around a million. Titus also reported consumer feedback obtained in the form of a mail-in registration being "overwhelming positive," and "More than 70% of Superman's target audience, that of 6 to 11-year-olds, rated the game as an 'A' title." All of this contradicted Superman 64s contemporaneous critical reputation, filled with claims of being one of the worst games of all time. Matt Casamassina of IGN suggested it was "executed so poorly that it actually serves to butcher the reputation of the prominent action hero". Casamassina speculated that the developer had not "put forth any priorities for this title other than to finish it" and commenting that the game has a "rushed, careless feel." Critics, such as those from Electronic Gaming Monthly noted the ruined potential of a game based on the Superman animated series, such as a "great story, interesting characters, plenty of villains", and fighting criminals in 3D landscapes. The multiplayer modes were a little more well-received than the single-player story-based mode, although issues of slowdown and difficulty controlling the space pod were noted.

The controls were panned for being confusing and difficult. Commands for various actions were reported to either be unresponsive or not working consistently, such as flying, landing, and picking up objects. Tim Weaver of N64 Magazine complained that "the only way to stop flying is to crash into a solid object, preferably a wall", and "you always have to press forward to go forward, even if you're facing into the camera". Conversely, Nintendo Magazine System, the official Nintendo magazine of Australia, counter-argued complaints about the flying controls, reasoning it was simple if the player read the instruction manual. Other technical problems were reported to be commonplace, such as bugs, unfavorable camera angles, bad enemy AI, broken frame rates, clipping of environments and objects, and poor collision detection. 

AllGames Scott Alan Marriott derogatorily labeled the gameplay as a set of "foggy, empty outdoor levels and indoor levels that seem out of place". Some critics found the missions too easy, un-engaging and nonsensical, Hardcore Gaming 101s John Sczepaniak going as so far to call them "obscenely stupid". He and other critics also panned what was viewed as ridiculous-looking fights with enemies, Sczepaniak writing, "melee combat is slow, awkward and imprecise, leading to much flailing of limbs". The ring missions were labeled the perfect mixture of "monotonous and difficult" by Shaun Conlin of The Electric Playground due to their limited margins of error and time limits. Only a few reviewers suggested Superman 64s gameplay may have been good conceptually, Official Nintendo Magazine stating, "this game's got great ideas, but it's a super disappointment." Jeuxvideo.com described the missions as action-packed and diverse, and Nintendo Power claimed it was ambitious for a Superman game to attempt to be more than just "a brawler with some flight and superpowers thrown". Critics found certain concepts unsuitable for a game based on the titular hero. The most frequently brought-up one was him flying through rings. Conlin noted limitations of life and the need of power-ups were placed on an invincible superhero with unlimited power.

The graphics were condemned as "basic" and poor for a Nintendo 64 game released in 1999. The most frequent criticism was the excessive distance fog. Mega Fun claimed it was an excuse for the developers to not take full advantage of the Nintendo 64 console, and Hugh Norton-Smith of Hyper wrote the fog would force players to "pre-empt approaching buildings in order to not hit them". The textures were criticized as near non-existent and too "repetitive", "flat and featureless" for a virtual world setting. Sczepaniak stated that the flat textures of Metropolis made it look like a Mode 7 background in a Super NES game. Jeuxvideo.com noted that the game's levels had little-to-no lighting, shadows, or clear perspective for the player to judge distances of characters and objects in the environment. Jevon Jenkins of Game Industry noted this problem with figuring out the distance between Superman and enemies, which added artificial challenge in fighting them and was made worse by poor camera angles. He also was turned off by Metropolis' lack of close-up details "that play a big part in the life of a city". Reviews also panned the character animation, such as AllGames Scott Alan Marriott who particularly dismissed Superman's punching and flying animations. Total N64 critic Lee described the intro cinematic as "like a scene from a C64 game in 1985", and stated "the sharp edges of the polygons gave Superman 'pixie' boots".

The audio was also criticized. The repetitiveness of the soundtrack was brought up by reviewers such as GameSpots Joe Fielder, who felt it "would be considered bad for the SNES". He also noted, "the sparse voice work even changes at one point, from Man of Steel actors to someone who sounds nothing like the lead of the show." As Norton-Smith proclaimed, "the soundtrack is more than capable of causing spontaneous aneurysms at 50 paces, and the handful of canned smashing moves do a great job at driving home the horror." However, Superman 64s presentation was not completely without supporters. Chris Johnston of Electronic Gaming Monthly found the graphics "semi-decent" if "oddly letterboxed", and Marriott was fond of them for being "colorful" and "simple". Some reviewers praised the visuals' closeness to the animated series, as well as the inclusion of its original voice actors, Weaver highlighting Lex Luthor's laugh which "almost made up for Superman being so hideous". Lukewarm appreciation was also given to the music, including from Jeuxvideo.com who noted its atmospheric nature although disliked its lack of stylistic variance throughout the game.

Statements of Superman 64 being one of the worst video games of all time have continued in later years. The game has ranked on all-time worst lists of publications such as Electronic Gaming Monthly (2013), The Guardian (2015), SVG.com (2020), and topped those of GameSpy (2004) and GameTrailers (2006). It also appeared on worst-of decade-end lists of Filter and Nintendo Power. It continues to be called the all-time worst of the Superman video games, which are usually not well-received. As of 2017, Superman 64 holds the Guinness World Record for lowest-rated superhero game, citing its Gamerankings aggregate score of 22.9%. Reported The Guardian in 2018, "Superman 64 has cultivated a fanbase of curious masochists eager to see how bad it really is. Twitch and YouTube host plenty of videos dedicated to the anti-glory of Superman 64, some of them made by people who were barely born when it was released." Superman 64 was number 11 in an Uproxx list of the top 100 Nintendo 64 games according to 250,849 user ratings from various websites. Publication writer Derrick Rossignol was baffled by the ranking: "I attribute that to users ironically giving the game many positive ratings over the years. Thankfully, though, those shenanigans don’t seem prevalent in the data and Superman is the only notable head-scratcher that I noticed."

Notes

References

Citations

Bibliography

External links

 

1999 video games
Cancelled PlayStation (console) games
Nintendo 64 games
Nintendo 64-only games
Superhero video games
Video games based on Superman: The Animated Series
Video games based on adaptations
Titus Software games
Video games about virtual reality
Video games developed in France
Multiplayer and single-player video games
Action-adventure games
Video games set in the United States